Balmain South was an electoral district of the Legislative Assembly in the Australian state of New South Wales from 1894. It was abolished in the 1904 re-distribution of electorates following the 1903 New South Wales referendum, which required the number of members of the Legislative Assembly to be reduced from 125 to 90 and was reabsorbed into the district of Balmain.

Members for Balmain South

Election results

References

Former electoral districts of New South Wales
Constituencies established in 1894
1894 establishments in Australia
Constituencies disestablished in 1904
1904 disestablishments in Australia